Mountain Rock Music Festivals, held on a farm near Woodville and later moved to a site near Palmerston North, were widely celebrated Kiwi music events in New Zealand during the 1990s. The event was created and promoted by Paul Geange and Paul Campbell, a Palmerston North Musician and founder of the infamous El Clubbo and the Palmerston North Musician's Society.

New Zealand's online encyclopedia, Te Ara, notes that "There are regular jazz, folk, ethnic and country music awards and festivals, some of which have been in existence for decades. Large music festivals, for example Sweetwaters, Nambassa and The Big Day Out, have been staged periodically since the 1970s."

Event years
 1992 Mountain Rock Music Festival I
 1993 Mountain Rock Music Festival II
 1994 Mountain Rock Music Festival III
 1995 Mountain Rock Music Festival IV
 1996 Mountain Rock Music Festival V

Musicians
Mountain Rock Music Festival III:
 Dragon
 Hello Sailor
 Southside of Bombay
 Supergroove
 Midnight Oil
 Shona Laing
 Dave Dobbyn
 Straitjacket Fits
 The Exponents
 Kevin Borich Express
 Shihad
 The Mutton Birds
 Jan Hellriegel
 Greg Johnson Set
 Desert Road, the promoter's band.
 Rick Bryant
 Bill Direen
 Wildfire
 Head Like a Hole
 Silent Scream
 Steve Cooke
 Mana
 Pacific Edge

Film and television
The Maori Radio network broadcast Mountain Rock III live on air. 
On site, video and sound was recorded in the barn. Also, an independent film-maker from Auckland shot many hours on video and amateur video footage was also shot.

Further reading

References

External links
 Te Ara - the Encyclopedia of New Zealand
 Oceania Audio
 Bruce Sergent New Zealand Music

Rock festivals in New Zealand